Matthew William Good is a former Republican member of the Pennsylvania House of Representatives, representing the 3rd District. He was first elected in a special election on July 22, 2003, to fill the remainder of Karl Boyes' term. He lost re-election in 2006 to Democrat John Hornaman.

Good attended Central Catholic High School and earned a degree in Political Science from Gannon University. Prior to elective office, he worked as chief of staff for Karl Boyes from 1997 to 2003.

References

External links
 Pennsylvania House of Representatives - Matthew W. Good  official PA House website (archived)
Pennsylvania House Republican Caucus - Rep. Matthew Good official Party website (archived)

Living people
1975 births
Members of the Pennsylvania House of Representatives
Gannon University alumni